Lecanora garovaglioi is a species of crustose lichen in the family Lecanoraceae.

See also
List of Lecanora species

References

Lichen species
Lichens described in 1859
garovaglioi
Taxa named by Gustav Wilhelm Körber